Viktor Aleksandrovich Yevsyukov (born October 6, 1956, in Donetsk, in the Ukrainian SSR of the Soviet Union) is a retired javelin thrower who represented the Soviet Union and later Kazakhstan during his active career. He won the silver medal at the 1987 World Championships in Rome.

His personal best throw is 85.16 metres, achieved in June 1987 in Karl-Marx-Stadt (today Chemnitz). It is also the standing Kazakhstani record. His personal best with the old javelin design, in use prior to April 1986, was 93.70 metres, thrown in Kiev on July 17, 1985. This was the third best mark ever by a Soviet thrower, behind only Heino Puuste and Jānis Lūsis.

Achievements

External links

1956 births
Living people
Russian male javelin throwers
Kazakhstani male javelin throwers
Soviet male javelin throwers
Athletes (track and field) at the 1988 Summer Olympics
Olympic athletes of the Soviet Union
World Athletics Championships medalists
European Athletics Championships medalists
Sportspeople from Donetsk